The name Lana has been used for two tropical cyclones worldwide: 

Central Pacific: 
 Tropical Storm Lana (2009), a strong tropical storm that passed south of Hawaii. 

Western Pacific: 
 Typhoon Lana (1948) (T4802), a Category 1 typhoon that did not affect land.

Pacific hurricane set index articles
Pacific typhoon set index articles